List of organisations in the United Kingdom with a royal charter is an incomplete list of organisations based in the United Kingdom that have received a royal charter from an English, Scottish, or British monarch.

There are over 900 bodies  which have a UK Royal Charter. and a list of these is published by the Privy Council Office.

Organisations are listed with the year(s) the charter was granted. This may not be the same as the year the organisation was founded. Organisations may also have charters renewed or regranted, so multiple dates may be shown.

Alphabetical list

A

B

C

E

F

G

H

I

J
The Jockey Club

K

L

M

N

O
 The Open University (1969)
 The Officers' Association (1921)

P

Q
Queen's University of Belfast (1908)
Queen Mary and Westfield College, University of London

R

S

T

U

V
Venerable Order of Saint John (1888)

W

See also
List of Canadian organizations with royal patronage
List of organisations based in the Republic of Ireland with royal patronage
List of professional associations in the United Kingdom

References

 
Charter
Organisations with a royal charter
Organisations in the United Kingdom with a royal charter